The Hammond Typewriter was invented by James Bartlett Hammond and first manufactured in 1881.  The typeface used by the typewriter was also available as foundry type from the Inland Type Foundry. John Jonathon Pratt sold his 1882 patent rights to the company for the manufacture of the typewriter.

References

External links

 Hammond 1 typewriter, mahogany finish, 1885 at the Martin Howard Collection
 Hammond 1 typewriter, oak finish, 1885 at the Martin Howard Collection
 Hammond 1 b typewriter, 1886 at the Martin Howard Collection

Typewriters
Letterpress typefaces
Products introduced in 1881